Martin Kristensen (9 July 1921 – 29 April 1980) was a Danish footballer. He played in one match for the Denmark national football team in 1952.

References

External links
 

1921 births
1980 deaths
Danish men's footballers
Denmark international footballers
Place of birth missing
Association footballers not categorized by position